Didik Wahyu Wijayance (born 13 February 1994) is an Indonesian professional footballer who plays as a centre back for Liga 1 club Persikabo 1973 and the Indonesia national team. He is also a soldier in the Indonesian Army.

Club career

PSIR Rembang
In 2017, Didik Wahyu signed a contract with Indonesian Liga 2 club PSIR Rembang.

TIRA-Persikabo / Persikabo 1973
Didik Wahyu in 2018 signed for Liga 1 club Persikabo 1973 to play in the 2018 Liga 1 (Indonesia) season. He made his league debut on 30 April 2018 in a match against Bali United at the Sultan Agung Stadium, Bantul.

International career
Didik Wahyu, who has no experience playing in junior national teams, received a call to join the Indonesia national team in May 2021. He made his debut for that team in the 2022 FIFA World Cup qualification match against United Arab Emirates on 11 June 2021.

Career statistics

Club

International

References

External links
 Didik Wahyu at Soccerway
 

1994 births
Living people
Indonesian footballers
PSIR Rembang players
Persikabo 1973 players
Indonesian Premier Division players
Liga 2 (Indonesia) players
Liga 1 (Indonesia) players
Association football defenders
People from Rembang Regency
Sportspeople from Central Java
Indonesia international footballers